Tournon-d'Agenais is a commune in the Lot-et-Garonne department in south-western France.

History 
Tournon-d'Agenais was founded in 1271 by Philip III (1245–1285), King of France from 1270 to 1280 and son of the King Louis IX, commonly known as Saint Louis. 
At the heart of the urban planning in this bastide is the typical central square (Place des Corniers) with stone houses above arched stone arcades. This reflects the planners’ intent to create a vital place for social and commercial exchanges among the new residents. In addition, the halle (market building), the town house and the maison of Bayle are located in this central square, showing a centralization of the municipal institutions. In the center of the square there is also the town wall, which was a symbol of a major struggle during the Middle Ages for an ample supply of water. The castle of Tournon d'Agenais destroyed in 1212, was noted by the English in 1283 and played an important role during the Hundred Year War. On the other side of the main square, a few streets away, there is the bishop's house called 'Abescat'. This was built during the 13th century and became the parish church of Tournon after the old church was destroyed in the 1560s during the French Wars of Religion.

See also
Communes of the Lot-et-Garonne department

References

Tournondagenais